Oleksandr Serhiyovych Bakumov (born 25 April 1989) is a Ukrainian soldier, professor, and politician currently serving as a People's Deputy of Ukraine from Ukraine's 173rd electoral district since 29 August 2019. He is a member of Servant of the People. Prior to becoming a People's Deputy, he was a captain in the State Border Guard Service of Ukraine during the War in Donbas, for which he was decorated with the Order of Merit.

Early life and career 
Oleksandr Serhiyovych Bakumov was born on 25 April 1989 in the city of Kharkiv in what was then the eastern Ukrainian Soviet Socialist Republic of the Soviet Union. He graduated from secondary school in 2005 with honours, and graduated from the Yaroslav Mudryi National Law University in 2010 with a specialty in jurisprudence. He graduated from National University of Kharkiv with honours. In 2012, he completed his post-graduate studies at Yaroslav Mudryi National Law University after defending his dissertation, titled "The Constitutional right of Ukrainian citizens to participate in elections and referenda, and problems of its implementation".

In 2017, six years after originally graduating from the National University of Kharkiv, he graduated with honours from the university's faculty of history. He is a qualified historian and history teacher.

From 2012 to 2015, Bakumov worked as an assistant in the department of constitutional law at the Yaroslav Mudryi National Law University. In November 2018, he was promoted to vice-rector of the university. He is a Candidate of Legal Sciences.

War in Donbas 
In 2015, Bakumov, as a conscript in the State Border Guard Service of Ukraine, served in the War in Donbas. He served with distinction, and was decorated following the end of his service. He was awarded the Order of Merit of the third degree, and recognised as a participant in the Anti-Terrorist Operation by both the President of Ukraine and the General Staff of the Ukrainian Armed Forces. He was also personally thanked by the Kharkiv City Council for his service to the country.

Political career 
Bakumov ran in the 2019 Ukrainian parliamentary election as the Servant of the People candidate for People's Deputy of Ukraine in Ukraine's 173rd electoral district (located in Kharkiv). At the time of the election, Bakumov was an independent. He was successfully elected, defeating incumbent People's Deputy  with 45.91% of the vote to Denysenko's 22.54%. In the Verkhovna Rada (parliament of Ukraine), Bakumov joined the Servant of the People faction and the Verkhovna Rada Law Enforcement Committee. He also joined the Slobozhanshchyna inter-factional association of People's Deputies.

As of 2019, Bakumov holds the record for the most number of draft laws proposed by a People's Deputy from the city of Kharkiv's districts to be accepted in the 9th Ukrainian Verkhovna Rada. He is also a record holder among Kharkiv's deputies for the number of speeches he has given on the floor of the Verkhovna Rada, speaking 20 times in 2019 alone. He has also been active on social media, publicising his work as a People's Deputy.

Bakumov was criticised by anti-corruption non-governmental organisation Chesno in 2020 for distributing personal protective equipment to medical facilities in Kharkiv, in what it regarded as an attempt to sway voters.

On 8 November 2021, Bakumov was one of the 24 People's Deputies to join Dmytro Razumkov in forming the Smart Politics political alliance after Razumkov was removed from his position as Chairman of the Verkhovna Rada.

Notes

References 

1989 births
Living people
Ninth convocation members of the Verkhovna Rada
Politicians from Kharkiv
Servant of the People (political party) politicians
Ukrainian military personnel of the war in Donbas